Vevčani is a municipality in western North Macedonia. Vevčani is also the name of the municipal seat and the only settlement of the municipality. This municipality is part of the Southwestern Statistical Region.

Geography
The municipality borders Struga Municipality to the north, east, and south and Albania to the west.

Demographics

According to the last national census from 2002, this municipality has 2,359 inhabitants. Ethnic groups in the municipality include:

References

External links
 Official website

 
Southwestern Statistical Region
Municipalities of North Macedonia